Pine Bluff is an unincorporated community located in the town of Cross Plains, Dane County, Wisconsin, United States.

It is the site of the observatory of the University of Wisconsin.

Notes

Unincorporated communities in Dane County, Wisconsin
Unincorporated communities in Wisconsin